Sarum is a genus of leaf beetles in the subfamily Eumolpinae, found in Africa. Most of its species were originally placed in Rhembastus.

Species
 Sarum baerti Selman, 1972
 Sarum geminatus (Jacoby, 1900)
 Sarum inermis (Jacoby, 1901)
 Sarum mashonanus (Jacoby, 1901)
 Sarum monardi (Pic, 1940)
 Sarum obscurellus (Gerstaecker, 1871)
 Sarum pergeminatus (Burgeon, 1941)

References

Eumolpinae
Chrysomelidae genera
Beetles of Africa